Rossum is a village in the Dutch province of Overijssel. It is a part of the municipality of Dinkelland, and lies about 4 km north of Oldenzaal on the road to Ootmarsum.

It was first mentioned in the late-10th century as Rohthem, and means "settlement near cleared forest". In 1840, it was home to 504 people.

The Hunenborg is a circular rampart to the north of Rossum. In 1916, remnants of wooden buildings were discovered at the site. Later a wooden dam dating from the 1150s was uncovered, and may be the location of a 10th century fortress of the Prince-Bishop of Utrecht.

In the rural environment some farms can be found in the traditional building style of the timber framed Low German house.

Notable people 
 Patrick Bosch (1964–2012), football player

Gallery

References

Populated places in Overijssel
Twente
Dinkelland